This is a comparison of various aspects of software offering system dynamics features:

Due to concerns over commercial postings on the system dynamics main topic, commercial hyperlinks are specifically NOT active on this list.

Table of system dynamics software

L.Graphing library MxGraph is licensed separately under paid commercial licence

See also

 List of computer simulation software

References

System dynamics
Systems theory